Mel Brown (22 July 1935 – 12 November 2019) was a Canadian basketball player. He competed in the men's tournament at the 1956 Summer Olympics.

References

External links
 

1935 births
2019 deaths
Basketball people from Alberta
Basketball players at the 1956 Summer Olympics
Canadian men's basketball players
Olympic basketball players of Canada
People from Athabasca, Alberta